Lioptilodes testaceus is a species of moth in the genus Lioptilodes known from Chile. Moths of this species take flight in July and October–December and have a wingspan of 20–23 millimetres.

References

Platyptiliini
Moths described in 1852
Endemic fauna of Chile